Caumont-l'Éventé is a former commune in the Calvados department in northwestern France. On 1 January 2017, it was merged into the new commune Caumont-sur-Aure.

Population

International relations
It is twinned with the Devon town of Uffculme.

Administration
Caumont-l'Éventé was the seat of the former canton of Caumont-l'Éventé, which included 14 communes with 6373 inhabitants (2008).

See also
Communes of the Calvados department

References

Former communes of Calvados (department)
Calvados communes articles needing translation from French Wikipedia
Populated places disestablished in 2017